Chain is the Sixth studio album by Japanese boy band KAT-TUN and was released in Japan on February 22, 2012 by J-One Records. On January 13, KAT-TUN endorsed the mobile game site "entag!" which used KAT-TUN's album track "Smile for You" as a CM song and the first-ever KAT-TUN animation, "Ai wa KAT-TUN", voiced by KAT-TUN themselves, was launched on entag! site for a limited period. Ai wa KAT-TUN hit 1,000,000 views in just 2 weeks.

Album information
Sixth album release from KAT-TUN including five single tracks, seven new songs, and five new songs featuring member's solo part (total of 17 songs). Regular Edition contains a bonus hidden track, "CHAIN OF LOVE".  The jacket design used for the limited edition is different from the one used for the regular edition. This edition includes a lyrics card. The jacket design used for the limited edition is different from the one used for the regular edition. This edition includes a bonus DVD with music video(s) and bonus video footage. Comes with a booklet.

Chart performance
In its first week of its release, the album topped the Oricon album chart, reportedly selling 110,055 copies. This feat will mark their sixth consecutive album to top the Oricon Album Charts since their first album, “Best of KAT-TUN” (released in March 2006). This record has surpassed rock band The Checker’s record of topping five consecutive albums and with this, KAT-TUN broke the record for the first time in 24 years and 10 months. KAT-TUN placed at No.8 in the second weeks, reportedly selling 10,761 copies and in the third weeks of its release the single placed at No.25, reportedly selling 4,235 copies.

By the end of the year, Chain was reported to selling 133,262 copies and was later certified Gold by RIAJ denoting over 100,000 shipments.

Track listing

Charts

References

External links
 Chain product information

KAT-TUN albums
2012 albums